Artsyom Skitaw (born 21 January 1991) is a Belarusian professional football player currently playing for Vitebsk.

External links

1991 births
Living people
Sportspeople from Vitebsk
Belarusian footballers
Association football defenders
FC Vitebsk players